Section Paloise, commonly referred to as Section  or as Pau , is a professional rugby union club based in Pau, France. They compete in the Top 14, France's top division of rugby, and the EPCR Challenge Cup.

The club won the Bouclier de Brennus three times in 1928, 1946 and 1964 and the European Challenge in 2000.

The club also won the Challenge Yves du Manoir in 1939, 1952 and 1997, as well as a French Pro D2 title in 2015.

A stronghold of French rugby, the club has become a symbol of Béarn culture and heritage. The official Section Paloise anthem is the Honhada, since March 2012.  The lyrics of the song were composed on the air of the famous Scottish ballad The water is wide.

Section are sponsored by French petroleum company TotalEnergies.

Recent France internationals Imanol Harinordoquy, Damien Traille, and Lionel Beauxis began their professional club careers with Section.

History

Rugby in Pau and Béarn 
After Le Havre and Bordeaux, Pau was the third major provincial French city to host rugby. As a matter of fact, the sport's presence has been attested since 1890 by the Coquelicots de Pau (Poppies of Pau), playing matches against the neighbouring teams of the Montagnards de Bayonne (Mountaineers of Bayonne) and the Pyrénéenne de Tarbes.

Stade Palois was founded in 1899 by former students of the Lous-Barthou high school, who were imbued with Anglophilia, in vogue in Pau during the Belle Epoque.

Beginnings and first title (1902 - 1939) 

Founded in April 1902, the Section paloise de ligue girondine is an all-round sports club in Pau. Since 1905, it is simply called Section paloise. At that time, rugby or "rugby football" was hugely popular. The club was first established as a Barette (sport) team, yet the club very quickly turned towards this new sport of rugby union. A rugby club had already been formed on November 12, 1899, since the Stade palois, had been founded in café on rue Bayard. The Stade Palois was thus integrated into Section to form the dominant club in bearnese rugby. In 1912, Section Paloise abandoned its blue and black jerseys, in order to definitively adopt green and white as its colours. The club was then led by Welshman Tom Potter, who took on the role of player-coach until the outbreak of the Great War. The club (all sports combined) paid a heavy price, with around forty deaths on the battlefields.

During the 1927-1928 season, the first team won the title of Côte Basque champion for the second consecutive year. Subsequently, it finished first in its pool of 5 in the French championship. In the following groups of 4, it defeated Stade Français, USA Perpignan and Lyon OU as well as the defending champions Stade Toulousain in the semi-final by 3-0 after extra time (1 try at zero).

Section paloise won the final by beating Quillan 6-4 in Toulouse in May 1928. That day the local newspaper, Le Patriote, reported that the "berets" beat the "hats".

Before the war, the Section paloise won the  Challenge Yves du Manoir in the 1938-1939 edition against RC Toulon by a score of 5-0 after extra time, courtesy of a try by Desperbasque and transformed by the full-back Courtade.

After WWII 
In 1946, at the end of the war, the club was once again crowned French champions. Section Paloise, won the prize, beating the likes of Toulouse and Agen. In spite of some uninspiring results during the first phase of the championship, Section successively beat Stade Toulousain in the quarter-finals and Perpignan in the semi-finals (6-3 after extra time) to reach the final against their neighbours from the French capital. However, guided by a series of 12 consecutive victories, FC Lourdes were largely defeated 11-0 at the Parc des Princes in Paris. The press noted then that the Section had a very homogeneous team without "stars" but with a perfect physical and moral condition. Theo Cazenave, Pierre Lauga and captain André Rousse are some of the figures of this remarkable XV.

Section Paloise lost in the semi-fi+nals of the 1950 French championship against the future French Olympic champion, Castres Olympique.

After a French Cup semi-final in 1951, the team won the Yves du Manoir challenge in 1952. In 1959, François Moncla, then international and title holder with Racing Club de France, became captain and a new, younger team was formed.

The team slowly took its bearings and in 1964, Section Paloise became French champion for the third time, beating the great Béziers 13-0. Its stars at the time were Moncla, Piqué, Capdouze, Saux, Etcheverry and Abadie. However, all had started badly during this season, the press even published a headline in October entitled La Section en perdition (Section in Perdition). The team had just lost 31-3 in Agen and lost at Croix du Prince by 24-3 to their heavyweight rivals. The players returned to the changing rooms under the whistles and some supporters tore up their season tickets. Year in year out, the team qualified for the finals in extremis with a 3-0 victory against Saint-Girons. Section thus qualifies in thirtieth position out of a total of 32 qualifiers. The adventure gradually took shape with successive victories over Brive, Chalon, Bayonne and Narbonne before the consecration against Béziers.

Robert Paparemborde era (1965 - 1990) 
The following seasons were more unspectacular from a sporting point of view, with captain Moncla stopping his career at the beginning of the 1967 season. From 1968 onwards, a new development took place, as the positions of General President and Rugby President could not be held concurrently. It was the departure of Albert Cazenave after 16 years as President, and that of his brother Theo from the role of coach.

That same year, the Section saw the birth of a young talent from Laruns in the Ossau Valley. Robert Paparemborde started his first game as an inside centre but it was as a prop that he became a world reference. Laurent Cabannes made his debut at the age of 17 and years later became one of the world's best flankers. On a sporting level, the first team lost to Montferrand 14-11 in the quarter-finals in 1970 and reached the semi-finals against Narbonne in 1974, having gone past Agen in the round of 16 by a surprise 24-21. The team spent a single season in Group B, 1977-1978, and then moved back to the elite immediately.

Section did not fulfil its 18-year rule, after 1928, 1946 and 1964 as they did not win another title in 1982, narrowly defeated by SU Agen in the Round of 16. They did, however, reach the quarter-finals in 1983 against Nice.

At the end of the 1980s, with two seasons in Group B, the first team reached the finals of this category but narrowly failed (1989 and 1990). The Section was then in a delicate sporting and economic situation.

Revival then fall (1990 - 2006) 
In October 1990, the club left its historic Stade de la Croix du Prince for the more modern Stade du Hameau. This move helped the club to solve its debts, as the Croix du Prince was sold to the Pau Town Hall. The beginning of the 1990s saw the first team begin to recover and they remained in Group A in 1991 and 1992. In 1993, the team even reached the Top 16 but failed to qualify for the quarter-finals in favour of FC Grenoble who were deprived of the title after a refereeing error and RC Narbonne who played their fifth quarter-final in 6 seasons.

During the 1994 and 1995 seasons, Section Paloise did not reach the top 16 and participated in the Moga Cup where it failed in the final against Aviron Bayonnais in Mont de Marsan.

Rugby Palois moves up in the hierarchy and obtains again good results. Also in 1996, the Section played in the final of the Challenge Yves du Manoir and was eliminated in the semi-final of the French championship, each time against Brive. These results enabled the club to qualify for the second edition of the European Rugby XV Cup.

In 1997, the Section was once again awarded a national trophy which was the Yves du Manoir challenge, while reaching the quarter-finals of the French championship, again both times against the same team from Bourgoin. In 1998, it reached the semi-finals of the H-Cup, beaten only by the future winner of the competition (the English Bath). In 2000, the Section won the European Shield against Castres by 34-21 in Toulouse. The same season, Pau eliminates Montferrand in the quarter-final of the French championship but misses the final by a hair's breadth against Colomiers in the semi-final. The Section lost 24-22 after extra time, the team is led by Joël Rey, David Aucagne, Thierry Cléda, Frédéric Torossian and David Dantiacq.

The following seasons were much more disappointing. The team is often satisfied to play the maintenance in the first division except a qualification in play-off in 2003, and a good course in European challenge in 2005 which sees it only failing in the final against the Sale Sharks. The Section is finally relegated to Pro D2 after the 2005-2006 season, a relegation that it had already avoided by very little the previous season (victory in the play-off). The club plays in Pro D2 from the 2006-2007 season hoping for a better tomorrow, betting a lot on training, like those youngsters trained at the club and who wore the jersey of the French Rugby team during the 2000s: Beauxis, Brusque, Harinordoquy, Traille and Bernat-Salles.

Rebuilding and then returning to ambitions (since 2006) 
Section Paloise returned to the elite of French rugby in 2011-2012, after a season that saw it finish second in the championship, and undefeated at home, lost in the final against Stade Montois (29-20). In 2012-2013, the club again reached the Pro D2 final to gain promotion to the Top 14. They most recently earned promotion by winning the championship of the second-level Rugby Pro D2 in 2015, nine years after having been relegated from the top flight.

On this occasion, the clubs of supporters, partners and other works councils organised a trip that will bring together no less than 142 buses to the Stade Chaban-Delmas. However, at this stage of the competition, the Section still lost to CA Brive by a score of 30-10 in front of 33,175 spectators.

After another disappointment the following season against La Rochelle, defeated 35-18 at the Stade Marcel-Deflandre in the semi-finals, the club made a good recruitment for the coming season with the arrival of manager Simon Mannix. Section obtained direct access to the Top 14 that year. As soon as the season ended, Simon Mannix used his address book to bring in players like Colin Slade, Carl Hayman and Conrad Smith, considered at that time to be of the best centres in the world.

Smith is now high-performance director at the club.

Mannix was dismissed in 2019 after five seasons, when a string of poor results convinced the board to part ways.

The first team is now coached by Thomas Domingo, Geoffrey Lanne-Petit and Paul Tito, after joint head coaches Nicolas Godignon and Frédéric Manca took a step back  at the end of 2020.

Club Identity

Colours 
The colours of Section Paloise have been green and white since 1912. Previously, the players wore blue and black jerseys (a legacy of Stade palois) which were soon abandoned for these new colours. Jean Plaà (manager at the time) justified this choice as green represents the club's hopes and white the snow of the Pyrenees in Bearn. It has since become customary for the club's teams to wear a white jersey at home and a green jersey away from home.

In recent years, a black and green jersey has been regularly used for playing away.

Logo 
The coat of arms of Section Paloise represents the Pic du the Midi d'Ossau mountain, surrounded by green and white. Pic du the Midi d'Ossau is a Pyrenean peak, locally nicknamed Jean-Pierre which symbolises the region for many people from Béarn.

A second version of the coat of arms was released in 1998 for the creation of the professional structure, displayed on the jerseys of the first team at the beginning of the 2001-2002 season. This one then keeps the famous peak as emblem but evolves towards a darker bottle green colour. The latest version of the coat of arms dates from the start of the 2012-2013 season. The colour of the coat of arms reverts to the original lighter green and incorporates the new appellation Section paloise Béarn Pyrénées. With this name change, the club symbolises the desire of its directors to further anchor the club as the driving force behind professional rugby in Béarn but more generally in the Pyrenees.

Hymn and songs 
Section Paloise's official anthem is the Honhada since March 2012. The song, composed by Didier Fois (Arraya, Hestiv'Oc festival, Ostau Bearnés), was met with a mixed reception in its early days and soon became a must for fans, who sing it at the start of every match. The lyrics of the song were composed on the air of the famous Scottish ballad The water is wide, also covered by Renaud in the Northern Irish Ballad.

Traditional Bearn songs from local band Nadau such as the Encantada and De cap tà l'immortèla as well as the famous Béarn anthem Si Canti are also widely popular among the local faithful. De cap tà l'immortèla had long been considered to be the unofficial anthem Section Paloise as it is so popular with the public.

Mascot 
The club's mascot is a bear named Bearnie (pronounced "Bernie"). The bear was chosen because it is one of the symbols of the Pyrenees, and its name is a play on words with Béarn, the region of which Pau has been the capital since 1464.

Club honours
 French premiership
 Champions: 1928, 1946, 1964
 Challenge Yves du Manoir
 Champions: 1939, 1952, 1997
 European Challenge Cup
 Champions: 2000
 Rugby Pro D2
 Champions: 2015

Finals results

French championship

Challenge Cup

Pro D2 promotion playoffs

Current standings

Current squad

The Pau squad for the 2022–23 season is:

Espoirs squad

The Section Paloise Espoirs squad is:

Notable former players

 
 Karim Bougherara
 Malik Hamadache
 Patricio Albacete
 Lisandro Arbizu
 Santiago Fernandez
 Juan Pablo Orlandi
 Gonzalo Quesada
 Garrick Morgan
 Jesse Mogg
 Ben Mowen
 Matt Philip
 Afusipa Taumoepeau
 Mike Burak
 Al Charron
 Ryan Smith
 Matt Tierney
 Sergio Valdés
 Steffon Armitage
 Joseph Mbu
 Sireli Bobo
 Saula Radidi
 Aminiasi Tuimaba
 Watisoni Votu
 Dominiko Waqaniburotu
 André Abadie
 Jean Michel Agest
 Nicolas Agnesi
 David Aguilar
 Laurent Arbo
 David Aucagne
 Lionel Beauxis
 Philippe Bernat-Salles
 Thomas Bianchin
 Pascal Bomati
 Hugo Bonneval
 Mohamed Boughanmi
 Jean Bouilhou
 Sébastien Bruno
 Nicolas Brusque
 Laurent Cabannes
 Romain Cabannes
 Jean Capdouze
 Philippe Carbonneau
 Paul Cassagne
 Jean-Emmanuel Cassin
 Florian Cazalot
 Jean-Charles Cistacq
 Marc Dal Maso
 David Dantiacq
 Clément Darbo
 Ibrahim Diarra
 Sébastien Descons
 Julien Delannoy
 Thomas Domingo
 Mathieu Dourthe
 Louis Dupichot
 Marc Etcheverry
 Sébastien Fauqué
 Lionel Faure
 Romain Froment
 Jean-Michel Gonzalez
 Pierrick Gunther
 Imanol Harinordoquy
 Antoine Hastoy
 Jean Hatchondo
 Jean Louis Jordana
 Thierry Lacrampe
 Christophe Laussucq
 Claude Mantoulan
 Henri Marracq
 Lionel Mallier
 François Moncla
 Robert Paparemborde
 Baptiste Pesenti
 Julien Pierre
 Jean Piqué
 Adrien Planté
 Lucas Pointud
 Bastien Pourailly
 Jean Preux
 Jean-Baptiste Peyras-Loustalet
 Joel Rey
 Jean Saux
 Atila Septar
 Michel Sorondo
 Jean-Marc Souverbie
 Patrick Tabacco
 Fernand Taillantou
 Benjamin Thiéry
 Julien Tomas
 Frederic Torossian
 Damien Traille
 Pierre Triep-Capdeville
 Quentin Valançon
 Merab Kvirikashvili
 Mamuka Magrakvelidze
 Paddy Butler
 James Coughlan
 Marco Zanon
 Abdellatif Boutaty
 Jamie Mackintosh
 Elijah Niko
 Peter Saili
 Colin Slade
 Ben Smith
 Conrad Smith
 Benson Stanley
 Tom Taylor
 Luke Whitelock
 Hari Dumitraş
 Iulian Dumitraș
 Alexandru Manta
 Răzvan Mavrodin
 Sorin Socol
 Marius Tincu
 Lourens Adriaanse
 Elton Jantjies
 Viacheslav Grachev
 Jeremy Tomuli
 Euan Murray
 Mohamadou Diarra
 Tonga Leaʻaetoa
 Taniela Moa

Rivalries 
The high density of rugby clubs in south-west France has led to numerous rivalries between SectionPaloise and neighbouring clubs. In Béarn, the rivalry has mainly centred around the often muscular clashes against FC Oloron, also known as Fécéo.

However, Stadoceste tarbais has been another great historical rival since the 1910s.

Finally, Section has long-standing sporting rivalries dating back to the 1910s with the other major historical clubs of the Adour region: Aviron Bayonnais, Biarritz Olympique, FC Lourdes, Stade Montois & US Dax.

The basques of Aviron Bayonnais have not been able to win in Pau against Section since 1946.

See also
 List of rugby union clubs in France
 Rugby union in France

References

External links
 
  Section Paloise Official website

Pau
Rugby clubs established in 1902
Sport in Pau, Pyrénées-Atlantiques
1902 establishments in France